Erik Christiansen (born 20 September 1956 in Copenhagen) is a Danish rower.

References 
 
 

1956 births
Living people
Danish male rowers
Rowers from Copenhagen
Rowers at the 1980 Summer Olympics
Rowers at the 1984 Summer Olympics
Olympic bronze medalists for Denmark
Olympic rowers of Denmark
Olympic medalists in rowing
Medalists at the 1984 Summer Olympics